The Lockheed LC-130 is a ski-equipped United States Air Force variant of the C-130 Hercules used in the Arctic and Antarctic. Ten are currently in service with the 109th Airlift Wing of the New York Air National Guard.

Design and development
The LC-130 started as a prototype model developed by modifying a C-130A with skis in 1956. After testing in 1957, 12 additional C-130A models were modified with skis and hydraulics under the designation of C-130D. In 1959 the first four factory equipped, ski-based Hercules were produced under the Navy designation of UV-1L. These C-130s are USAF C-130B models. Later in the program the designation was changed from UV-1L to C-130BL.  This designation was again later changed to LC-130F when aircraft nomenclature was standardized for all services by the U. S. Defense Department in 1962.  These four aircraft were bought by the Navy Department to support the Navy's Antarctic expedition that was ongoing at the time. The Navy also bought one LC-130R model in 1968. The National Science Foundation bought the second set of aircraft as replacement aircraft. The Polar Program Division of the Foundation had assumed management of the Antarctic Program in the early 1970s. These aircraft were designated LC-130R and were delivered in two lots: the first lot of three in 1974 and the remaining two in 1976.

The primary mission of the LC-130 is supporting the scientific community in Antarctica by transporting cargo and personnel from the McMurdo Station to field stations and camps, including the Amundsen–Scott South Pole Station.

The aircraft are equipped with retractable skis that allow the aircraft to land on snow and ice as well as on conventional runways. The aircraft have provisions for using rocket-assisted-takeoff (RATO) rockets, four on each side of the aircraft, that are installed and used when the LC-130 operates from rough, unprepared snow surfaces, sticky snow or when shorter takeoff runs are needed. Originally the expended rocket bottles were jettisonable, but due to several accidents which occurred when a bottle detached from the aircraft during takeoff, the mounting provisions were changed so that the bottles could not be released in the air.

Operational history

The Navy Antarctic Development Squadron Six (First designated VX-6, then VXE-6 from 1969) originally operated the LC-130 aircraft. Initially, VXE-6 was home based at the Naval Air Station Quonset Point, Rhode Island and later at the Naval Air Station Point Mugu, California. Operation of the aircraft was transferred in 1999 to the 109th Airlift Wing of the New York Air National Guard when Navy support of the Antarctic program was terminated and VXE-6 was decommissioned.

There have been two crashes in Antarctica. The first crash occurred in 1971 at an ice runway  from McMurdo Station as a result of two JATO bottles ejecting improperly and striking the plane's propeller. This aircraft's registration was 148321.The second crash occurred when a second similar aircraft (159131) was destroyed, while delivering replacement parts for the first aircraft; this resulted in two fatalities and nine injuries. The repaired aircraft was dug out of the snow, had temporary repairs and then flown to McMurdo Station in 1987 at a cost of $10 million and thence to Christchurch, New Zealand. It re-entered service and spent several more seasons doing antarctic work. The aircraft was retired to Davis-Monthan AFB sometime after 1998.

Currently all LC-130 aircraft are operated by the New York Air National Guard and are based at the Air National Guard's facility at Schenectady County Airport. There are two versions. Seven aircraft are LC-130H-2 (Three of these were Navy LC-130R from VXE-6 converted to LC-130H-2). Three are the LC-130H-3 model.

Aircraft on display

 A D-model LC-130 is on display at the main entrance to Stratton Air National Guard Base, located at the Schenectady County Airport in Schenectady, NY.
 The Pima Air & Space Museum has a 109th Tactical Airlift Group ski-equipped C-130D on display, one of the original twelve built before replacement of the fleet with the H model.

See also

References

External links

 109th Airlift Wing Home Page
 Bill Spindler's South Pole Home Page
 The Entire LC-130 Production List
 Development of the C-130D

C-0130L, Lockheed
C-130, L
Four-engined tractor aircraft
High-wing aircraft
Four-engined turboprop aircraft
LC-130
Articles containing video clips